Croatia-Sweden relations are foreign relations between Croatia and Sweden. Both countries established diplomatic relations on January 29, 1992.  Croatia has an embassy in Stockholm.  Sweden has an embassy in Zagreb and 2 honorary consulates (in Rijeka and Split).

Both countries are members of the European Union and the Council of Europe.

History
In July of 2022, Croatia have fully ratified Sweden's NATO membership application.

European Union
Sweden joined the EU in 1995. Croatia joined the EU in 2013.

NATO 
While Croatia became a member of NATO in 2009, Sweden has only initiated accession process in 2022. Croatian parliament voted nearly unanimously in support of Sweden's accession into the alliance.

See also 
 Foreign relations of Croatia
 Foreign relations of Sweden
 Sweden–Yugoslavia relations

References

External Links 
  Croatian Ministry of Foreign Affairs and European Integration: list of bilateral treaties with Sweden
  Swedish embassy in Zagreb

 

 
Sweden 
Bilateral relations of Sweden